Iryna Olehivna Blohina (born January 15, 1983, in Kyiv, Ukrainian SSR, USSR) is a Ukrainian sportsperson, singer/songwriter, actress and TV host. 
Director of the Legendary Deriugina School. 
Vice-President of Ukrainian Gymnastics Federation. She is  rhythmic gymnastics, National Olympic team coach as well as choreographer. 
For over 20 years her body of work for the Ukrainian National Team has created an immense body of work for the popularization of the sport including introducing Gala into the competition program, introducing  championship song and slogan.

Biography
She was born on January 15, 1983, in Kyiv to a family of well-known Ukrainian sportsmen. Her father is famous football player and coach Oleh Blokhin. Her mother is Irina Deriugina, multiple World and European champion and medalist in rhythmic gymnastics.

In 1990 she moved to Athens, Greece with her father when he became coach of famous Greek football club Olympiakos. She studied at St. Lawrence College.

In 1998 she started choreographing Gala for the National Team of Ukraine.

In 2000 she studied music, theatre and film production in Los Angeles, United States. When she lived in the US, she had some episodic roles in films and television: Click, Two and a Half Men and Thank You.

In 2003 for the first time in history her “Moulin Rouge” choreography with Anna Bessonova, Natalia Godunko and Tamara Yerofeyeva was performed at the World Championships in Budapest. She was the first to introduce Gala into the competition program. Many years later thanks to her efforts it became a mandatory part of every competition. She has been choreographing, directing and producing the Deriugina Cup Gala show for over 20 years today.

in 2011 she moved back to Kyiv, Ukraine to become an official coach with the National Olympic Team of Ukraine in rhythmic gymnastics as well as the coach of the Deriugina School. She made her debut as a coach at the 2011 World Championships in Montpellier, France.

In 2012 was her first Olympic Games in London as a coach with the National Team of Ukraine.

In fall of 2012 she was invited to direct and choreograph an all star Gala show in Seoul, Korea where 5 leading top countries of rhythmic gymnastics participated. The event was a huge success and sold out.

In 2012, she composed a song, "З'єднаємо Весь Світ" ("Let the whole world Unite"), which was widely sung during Euro 2012. That year Blokhina was a TV host of a popular Ukrainian TV show about football, called Великий футбол (Great Football). The next year, she wrote & performed "We Make This World Go!", which was the official song of the 2013 World Rhythmic Gymnastics Championships in Kyiv.

In 2013 she became coach of Anna Rizatdinova. Winning Gold medal at the 2013 World Rhythmic Gymnastics Championships in Kyiv. Once again she participated as one of the key organizers of the event. Director and choreographer of the Opening and Closing ceremony. For the first time there was a music video made with the participation of rhythmic gymnastics stars from around the world.

Her career as a coach was no fairy tale. She came with a different vision and a completely different unique approach which was new to the Ukrainian Deriugina school of gymnastics however she always stayed deeply rooted and true to the foundation of the Deriugina school. For many her style was hard to understand however everyone saw the result and the medals from each competition were proof. She was always centered in the technique and mental preparation of the athlete. This was a new trait to the Deriugina school approach. Prior repetition and many hours in the gym were key however her new approach where she states, “it's not how many hours you work or the amount of times you repeat an element - but in the quality. How you do it is key. You have to do every single movement with consciousness and awareness”. This approach became key in her success as a coach with raising Anna Rizatdinova to champion status.

November 1, 2014 Ireesha and her husband Aleksey Brynzak welcomed into the world Jacqueline Brynzak.

In 2015 at the World Rhythmic Gymnastics Championships in Stuttgart, Germany they won the license to go to the Olympic Games the next year in Rio, Brazil.

In 2016 Ireesha Blohina and Anna Rizatdinova brought home a bronze medal from the Olympic Games in Rio, Brazil.

References

Links
 
 Ireesha and Iryna visit Dmytro Shepelev (TV programme)
 Дочь Олега Блохина и Ирины Дерюгиной певица Ирина БЛОХИНА: «Иногда у меня перехватывает горло, сжимается сердце и подступают слезы, когда подумаю, что родители не вместе. Эта огромная рана останется в моей душе на всю жизнь» (in Russian)
 Blokhina Iryna Olehivna: musician, actress, TV presenter
 Profile on the TV Channel "Ukraine"

1983 births
Living people
Sportspeople from Kyiv
21st-century Ukrainian women singers
English-language singers from Ukraine
Television presenters from Kyiv
Ukrainian pop singers
Ukrainian gymnastics coaches